Ramaswamy Krishnamurthy (9 September 1899 – 5 December 1954), better known by his pen name Kalki, was an Indian writer, journalist, poet, critic and Indian independence activist who wrote in Tamil. He chose the pen-name "Kalki", the future incarnation of the Hindu God Vishnu. He founded a magazine, which was also named Kalki, with T Sadasivam being the co-founder, in 1941. Krishnamurthy‘s writings include over 120 short stories, 10 novellas, 5 novels, 3 historical romances, editorial and political writings and hundreds of film and music reviews.

Early life
Ramaswamy Krishnamurthy was born in a Brahmin family on 9 September 1899 in Puthamangalam, near Manalmedu, in Mayiladuthurai district in the Indian state of Tamil Nadu. Krishnamurthy's father was Ramaswamy Aiyar, an accountant in Puttamangalam village in the old Tanjore district of erstwhile Madras Presidency. He began his primary education in his village school and later attended Municipal High School in Mayavaram but quit in 1921, just short of completion of his Senior School Leaving Certificate, in response to Mahatma Gandhi's 1921 call for non-co-operation joining the Indian National Congress instead.

His son Kalki Rajendran was married to Sadasivam's daughter Vijaya. And Krishnamurthy's daughter Anandi was married to Sadasivam's nephew (sister's son) Ramachandran, known as Ambi in music circles. Anandi's daughter Gowri Ramanarayanan was a music critic for The Hindu newspaper, and she also learned music under M S Subbulakshmi.

Literary work
Krishnamurthy started writing fiction stories in Navaskthi in 1923 where he worked as a sub editor. He was working under the tutelage of Thiru Vi Ka when he published his first book in 1927. He started working with C Rajagopalachari in Thiruchengode in Gandhi Ashram. He published Vimochanam along with Rajaji, a journal propagating liquor prohibition. He was working in freedom struggle and during 1931, he was jailed for six months. He joined Ananda Vikatan, a popular Tamil magazine along with editor S S Vasan. He became very popular as a critic, witty author, political commentator and short story writer. He wrote under various pen names like "Kalki", "Ra. Ki", "Tamil Theni" and "Karnatkam". He left Ananda Vikatan and joined freedom struggle in 1941. On his release, he and Sadasivam started a weekly named Kalki. He was the editor in the journal till his death on 5 December 1954

Bibliography

Historical novels

Social novels (Tamil)
 Kalvanin Kadhali (1937)
 Thyaga Bhoomi (1938–1939)
 Magudapathi (1942)
 Abalayin kaneer (1947)
 Alai Osai (1948)
 Devagiyin Kanavan (1950)
 Mohini Theevu (1950)
 Poiman Karadu (1951)
 Punnaivanathu Puli (1952)
 Amara Thara (1954)

Short stories

Critical work
Krishnamurthy was also a film and music critic, writing under the pseudonym "Karnatkam". He also penned lyrics for many songs, most of which were adapted into Carnatic Music.

Honours
 The release of a postage stamp in honour of Krishnamurthy was among the highlights of the centenary celebrations. Government of Tamil Nadu announced the nationalisation of Krishnamurthy‘s works, this will enable publishers to produce reprints of his works.
 Krishnamuthy had the Sangeetha Kalasikhamani award conferred on him by The Indian Fine Arts Society in 1953.

Death
Krishnamurthy died in Chennai on 5 December 1954 aged 55 years from tuberculosis. Kalki magazine's special issue for Annai Sarada Devi, dated the day Krishnamurthy died, was his last editorial work. The magazine shared the information that his health was improving prior to his demise.

Legacy 
Veteran actor and former Chief Minister of Tamil Nadu [PORTIA'S), actor-turned-politician Kamal Haasan and director Mani Ratnam tried to adapt Krishnamurthy's novel Ponniyin Selvan into a film at different times, but only Mani Ratnam succeeded. The first part of Mani Ratnam's two-part film was released on 30 September 2022 as Ponniyin Selvan: I.

Biographies of Kalki
 Ponniyin Puthalvar by Sunda
 Amarar Kalki
 Oray Roja

See also 
 List of Indian writers
 Kalki (magazine)
 Ponniyin Selvan
 Parthiban Kanavu 
 Sivagamiyin Sapatham

References

External links

Kalki's Ponniyin Selvan (Tamil) Wikisource (Unicode)
Kalki's novels online,  Chennailibrary.com (in Tamil) 
Ponniyin Selvan Facts and Fiction, ponniyinselvan.in
English translation by Nandini Vijayaraghavan of Sivakamiyin Sabadham
English Translation by Indra Neelameggham of Ponniyin Selvan

Tamil-language writers
Children's writers in Tamil
Indian male novelists
1899 births
1954 deaths
20th-century deaths from tuberculosis
Tuberculosis deaths in India
Tamil dramatists and playwrights
Recipients of the Sahitya Akademi Award in Tamil
People from Mayiladuthurai district
Tamil journalists
Indian independence activists from Tamil Nadu
Journalists from Tamil Nadu
20th-century Indian novelists
20th-century Indian poets
Indian male dramatists and playwrights
Novelists from Tamil Nadu
20th-century Indian journalists
Poets from Tamil Nadu
Indian male poets
20th-century Indian male writers